The 3 arrondissements of the Loire-Atlantique department are:
 Arrondissement of Châteaubriant-Ancenis, (subprefecture: Châteaubriant) with 76 communes. The population of the arrondissement was 222,436 in 2016.  
 Arrondissement of Nantes, (prefecture of the Loire-Atlantique department: Nantes) with 76 communes.  The population of the arrondissement was 830,509 in 2016.  
 Arrondissement of Saint-Nazaire, (subprefecture: Saint-Nazaire) with 55 communes.  The population of the arrondissement was 327,907 in 2016.

History

In 1800 the arrondissements of Nantes, Ancenis, Châteaubriant, Paimbœuf and Savenay were established. In 1868 Saint-Nazaire replaced Savenay as subprefecture. The arrondissements of Ancenis and Paimbœuf were disbanded in 1926, and Ancenis was restored in 1943. The arrondissement of Châteaubriant-Ancenis was created in January 2017 from the former arrondissements of Châteaubriant and Ancenis and 4 communes from the arrondissement of Nantes.

References

Loire-Atlantique